Mark Thomson may refer to:

 Mark Thomson (politician) (1739–1803), United States Representative from New Jersey
 Mark Thomson (darts player) (born 1963), English darts player
 Mark Thomson (physicist), professor of experimental particle physics

See also
 Mark Thompson (disambiguation)
 Marc Thompson (disambiguation)